Rubellimicrobium roseum is a Gram-negative, non-spore-forming and non-motile bacterium from the genus of Rubellimicrobium which has been isolated from forest soil from the Yunnan province in China.

References 

Rhodobacteraceae
Bacteria described in 2013